The Socialist Party of the Balearic Islands–PSOE is the regional branch in the Balearic Islands of the Spanish Socialist Workers' Party (PSOE), the main centre-left party in Spain since the 1970s.

Secretary-Generals

Electoral performance

Parliament of the Balearic Islands

Cortes Generales

European Parliament

References

Balearic Islands
Political parties in the Balearic Islands
Political parties with year of establishment missing
Social democratic parties in Spain